8th Ohio Battery was an artillery battery that served in the Union Army during the American Civil War.

Service
The 8th Ohio Battery was organized at Camp Dennison near Cincinnati, Ohio and mustered in for a three-year enlistment on March 11, 1862, under Captain Louis Markgraf.

The battery was unattached, Army of the Tennessee, to April 1862. Artillery, 5th Division, Army of the Tennessee, to April 1862. Artillery, 3rd Division, Army of the Tennessee, to July 1862. Artillery, 5th Division, District of Memphis, Tennessee, to November 1862. Artillery, 2nd Division, District of Memphis, Right Wing, XIII Corps, Department of the Tennessee, to December 1862. Artillery, 2nd Division, Sherman's Yazoo Expedition, to January 1863. Artillery, 2nd Division, XV Corps, Army of the Tennessee, to September 1863. Artillery, 1st Division, XVII Corps, to April 1864. Maltby's Brigade, District of Vicksburg, to November 1864. Artillery Reserve, District of Vicksburg, to August 1865.

The 8th Ohio Battery mustered out of service at Camp Dennison on August 7, 1865.

Detailed service
Moved to Benton Barracks, Mo.; then to Savannah, Tenn., March 22–28, 1862. Battle of Shiloh, April 6–7, 1862. Advance on and siege of Corinth, Miss., April 29-May 30. March to Memphis, Tenn., June 1–17, and duty there until November, 1862. Grant's Central Mississippi Campaign November–December. "Tallahatchie March" November 26-December 12. Sherman's Yazoo Expedition December 20, 1862, to January 3, 1863. Chickasaw Bayou December 26–28. Chickasaw Bluff December 29. Expedition to Arkansas Post, Ark., January 3–10, 1863. Assault on and capture of Fort Hindman, Arkansas Post, January 10–11. Moved to Young's Point, La., January 17, and duty there until March. Expedition to Rolling Fork via Muddy, Steele's and Black Bayous, and Deer Creek March 14–27. Moved to Milliken's Bend and duty there until April. Demonstrations on Haines and Drumgould's Bluffs April 29-May 2. Moved to join army in rear of Vicksburg via Richmond and Grand Gulf May 2–14. Jackson, Miss., May 14. Siege of Vicksburg May 18-July 4. Assaults on Vicksburg May 19 and 22. Advance Jackson, Miss., May 5–10. Siege of Jackson July 10–17. Duty at Vicksburg until February 1864. Expedition from Vicksburg to Sunnyside Landing. Ark.. January 10–16, 1864. Duty in the defenses of Vicksburg until May 20, 1865. Expedition to Central Mississippi Railroad November 28-December 2, 1864. Moved to Natchez, Miss., May 20, 1865, and duty there until June 28. At Vicksburg until July 20.

Casualties
The battery lost a total of 23 men during service; 1 enlisted men killed, 22 enlisted men died of disease.

Commanders
 Captain Louis Markgraf
 Captain James F. Putnam

See also

 List of Ohio Civil War units
 Ohio in the Civil War

References
 Dyer, Frederick H.  A Compendium of the War of the Rebellion (Des Moines, IA:  Dyer Pub. Co.), 1908.
 Ohio Roster Commission. Official Roster of the Soldiers of the State of Ohio in the War on the Rebellion, 1861–1865, Compiled Under the Direction of the Roster Commission (Akron, OH: Werner Co.), 1886–1895.
 Reid, Whitelaw. Ohio in the War: Her Statesmen, Her Generals, and Soldiers (Cincinnati, OH: Moore, Wilstach, & Baldwin), 1868. 
Attribution

External links
 Ohio in the Civil War: 8th Ohio Battery by Larry Stevens
 8th Ohio Battery monument at Vicksburg

Military units and formations established in 1862
Military units and formations disestablished in 1865
Units and formations of the Union Army from Ohio
O
1862 establishments in Ohio